On August 23, 1903, at 7:33 a.m. a westbound newspaper train of the New York Central and Hudson River Railroad, originating in New York City, derailed in Little Falls, New York due to excessive speed on a curve, killing two crew members – the engineer and fireman. The train consisted of engine number 2941, baggage cars 2570 and 2535, and horse car 2312.

Background
The train originated in New York City at 3:00 a.m. All three cars were loaded with New York newspapers destined for upstate New York from Albany to Buffalo and Canada. The train had left Albany at 6:05 a.m. and was instructed to reach Syracuse within three hours, including stops in Schenectady, Fonda, Herkimer and Utica.  The train was also instructed to reduce speed in three locations – Amsterdam, Little Falls, and Rome. The train was run by engineer Robert Lilly, fireman Thomas Connolly, and conductor George Erhardt.  Lilly was an experienced engineer on freight trains.

Accident
After negotiating approximately 75% of the curve, the engine derailed and crossed two of the parallel tracks and went down an embankment landing on its side. The first baggage car also went over the embankment. The tender and second baggage car derailed but remained on the rail right-of-way, blocking the other tracks. The last car remained on its track.

Engineer Lilly (age 48) was killed instantly by decapitation and fireman Connolly (age 25) died from a broken neck and skull injuries shortly after being removed from the wreckage.  Four newspaper messengers were injured. The two most seriously injured were the only occupants of the destroyed baggage car.  They believed they survived only by being cushioned by bundles of newspapers, and were treated at the Little Falls hospital. The engine and second baggage car were damaged but not seriously and could be repaired.  The other derailed baggage car was destroyed.  All three set of tracks involved were forced out of service due to twisted rails and damaged ties.  Another train was sent and the newspapers were delivered with a two-hour delay.

Cause
Inspection of the track and equipment found no contributing defects. The track was "in perfect surface and alignment". The braking gear on the engine was in working order. The engine and tender had undergone routine maintenance the prior May. The engine's throttle was observed after the accident as being "wide open". According to the survivors, the train was approximately 15 minutes behind schedule and the engineer was trying to make up time.

The train left the track due to excessive speed on the curve. The conductor stated that the train did not reduce speed upon approaching the curve. Although there was no speed limit on the curve, most engineers did use braking to slow the train when rounding the curve.

Second Gulf Curve crash
The much more deadly Little Falls Gulf Curve crash of 1940 occurred on the same spot killing 31.

References

Railway accidents in 1903
Railway accidents and incidents in New York (state)
1903 in New York (state)
Herkimer County, New York
New York Central Railroad
Accidents and incidents involving New York Central Railroad